Sudurpashchim Province is one of the seven federal provinces of Nepal established by the country's new constitution of 20 September 2015, comprising nine districts, namely, Achham, Baitadi, Bajhang, Bajura, Dadeldhura, Darchula, Doti, Kailali and Kanchanpur. This province was formerly known as Province No. 7, and then as Sudurpashchim Pradesh. There are many categorized monuments sites in Sudurpashchim Province. Here are district wise lists of monuments which are in Sudurpashchim Province.

Lists per district of Sudurpashchim Province 
 List of monuments in Achham District
 List of monuments in Baitadi District
 List of monuments in Bajhang District
 List of monuments in Bajura District
 List of monuments in Dadeldhura District
 List of monuments in Darchula District
 List of monuments in Doti District
 List of monuments in Kailali District
 List of monuments in Kanchanpur District

References 

Sudurpashchim Province
 
Tourist attractions in Sudurpashchim Province